This is a list of statistics for the 2023 ICC Women's T20 World Cup. Each list contains the top five records except for the partnership records.

Team statistics

Highest team totals

Largest winning margin

By runs

By wickets

By balls remaining

Lowest team totals
Notes: This is a list of completed innings only; low totals in matches with reduced overs are omitted except when the team was all out. Successful run chases in the second innings are not counted.

Smallest winning margin

By runs

Individual statistics

Batting

Most runs

Highest scores

Most boundaries

References

External links
Official 2023 World Cup site
Cricket World Cup at icc-cricket.com

statistics

Cricket
Women's cricket
Women's cricket competitions
International cricket competitions
2023 in South African cricket
International women's cricket competitions in South Africa